Mountain Czar is an EP by the instrumental stoner rock band Karma to Burn. It was released in 2016 by SPV and Rodeostar Records.

Unlike their previous release Arch Stanton, Mountain Czar is not exclusively instrumental, with one track featuring Italian vocalist Stefanie Savy. The song, "Uccidendo Un Sogno," is an Italian-language rewrite of the Tom Petty classic Runnin' Down a Dream. Like the previous album's closing track "Fifty-Nine," this EP's ending track "Sixty-Three" contains a dialogue passage from the classic Spaghetti Western The Good, the Bad and the Ugly.

Track listing

Standard release

Personnel 
 William Mecum – guitar, bass
 Eric Clutter – bass
 Evan Devine – drums

Additional musicians
 Stephanie Savy – vocals on #4
 Manuel Bissig – guitar solo on #4

References

2016 albums
Karma to Burn albums